The Botlek originally was the name of a stretch of the Nieuwe Maas river, part of the Rhine–Meuse delta near the Dutch cities of Vlaardingen and Spijkenisse in the province of South Holland. Specifically, it was the name of the strait that separated the island of Rozenburg from the sand bar of Welplaat. The strait itself was merely the continuation of the Nieuwe Maas, and the stretch of the river south of Rozenburg continued to be called Nieuwe Maas until the confluence with Het Scheur formed the Brielse Maas estuary (now the Brielse Meer).

Major waterway regulation works were carried out in the Netherlands in the 19th and 20th centuries to improve water management and stop the delta from silting up; the Botlek was dammed off at its southern end (connecting Rozenburg and Welplaat) and remodelled into one of the largest of the Rotterdam seaports (see also Europoort).

Gallery 

Rhine–Meuse–Scheldt delta
Water transport in the Netherlands